Katie Rodan (nee Pregerson, born 1955–1956) is an American dermatologist, entrepreneur, and author. She is co-creator of the acne management system Proactiv, co-founder of anti-aging skincare company Rodan + Fields, and operates a private cosmetic dermatology practice in Oakland, California. In 2015, she was listed by Forbes as one of the 50 most successful self-made women in the United States. She is a billionaire.

Early life

Katie was born Katie Pregerson, the daughter of Bernardine and Harry Pregerson, a microbiology professor and a federal appeals court judge, respectively. Rodan's family is Jewish and she was raised in Los Angeles. She earned her undergraduate degree in history from the University of Virginia and her Doctor of Medicine degree from the University of Southern California School of Medicine. She completed her internship at Los Angeles County Hospital and in 1987 completed her residency in dermatology at Stanford University School of Medicine, where she was also appointed chief resident.

Career
In 1984, Rodan and Kathy A. Fields met during their dermatology residency at Stanford University School of Medicine. In 1995, they developed Proactiv Solution as a skincare treatment for acne.

In 2002, they launched Rodan + Fields. In 2003, Rodan + Fields was purchased by Estée Lauder. In 2006, the company moved to direct sales and multi-level marketing. In 2007, Rodan and Fields bought back the brand from Estée Lauder. Rodan + Fields uses independent consultants, mostly women, to sell its products. Only two percent of these consultants make more than minimum wage. Its business model has been criticized by consumer advocates as being close to a pyramid scheme.

Rodan is an adjunct clinical assistant professor of dermatology at Stanford University and has a private practice in medical, surgical, and cosmetic dermatology. In 2008, she was named a top doctor in the East Bay by Oakland Magazine. Rodan has been featured in print and broadcast media as an expert in dermatology, particularly cosmetic dermatology. She has been interviewed and quoted in media, including Fox Business News, Shape Magazine, O Magazine, Women's Health, Redbook, Allure, and Cosmopolitan.

Works
Rodan has co-authored books with Fields:

Personal life
Rodan is married to Amnon Rodan, with two children, and lives in San Francisco, California.

References

Further reading

External links

 

1950s births
Living people
American dermatologists
American medical researchers
20th-century American physicians
University of Virginia alumni
Jewish women in business
American women company founders
American company founders
American women business executives
Keck School of Medicine of USC alumni
American billionaires
Female billionaires
20th-century American women physicians
21st-century American women